Janosik can refer to:
 Janosik (1921 film), a Slovak film
 , a Polish comedy film
 Janosik (TV series), a Polish TV series
 Janosik. Prawdziwa historia, a Polish historical film
 Jánošík (disambiguation)